The 1975 New Orleans Saints season was the Saints ninth season and their first in the newly opened Louisiana Superdome. Despite the new stadium, they failed to match their 1974 output of 5–9, winning only two games and tying the San Diego Chargers for the league’s worst record.

Coach John North, who was hired four games into the 1973 exhibition season, was fired following a 38–14 road loss to the Los Angeles Rams in the sixth game. Director of Player Personnel Ernie Hefferle took over for the final eight games. His only win was his first game in charge, a 23–7 victory at home over the hated Atlanta Falcons.

The Saints were winless on the road for the fourth time in six seasons, leaving them 3–36–3 away from New Orleans since 1970.

The Saints wore white pants for the first time after wearing old gold pants for their first eight seasons. After 1975, New Orleans did not wear white jerseys and white pants again until introducing their Color Rush set in 2016.

Offseason

NFL draft

Personnel

Staff

Roster

Regular season

Schedule

Standings

References

External links 
 1975 New Orleans Saints at Pro-Football-Reference.com

New Orleans Saints
New Orleans Saints seasons
New Orl